Mandarin was the common spoken language of administration of the Chinese empire during the Ming and Qing dynasties. It arose as a practical measure, to circumvent the mutual unintelligibility of the varieties of Chinese spoken in different parts of China. Knowledge of this language was thus essential for an official career, but it was never formally defined. The language was a koiné based on Mandarin dialects. The southern variant spoken around Nanjing was prevalent in the late Ming era, although later on a form based on the Beijing dialect took the stage by the mid-19th century and developed into Standard Chinese in the 20th century. In some 19th-century works, it was called the court dialect.

History 
By the late imperial period, local varieties of Chinese had diverged to the extent that people from different provinces could not understand one another. In order to facilitate communication between officials from different provinces, and between officials and the inhabitants of the areas to which they were posted, imperial administrations adopted a koiné based on various northern dialects. Mandarin of the early Ming dynasty was not identical to any single dialect. Though its variant spoken in the area of Nanjing, which was the first Ming capital and a major cultural center, gained prestige gradually through the course of the dynasty. This standard language of the Ming and Qing dynasty, sometimes referred to as Middle Mandarin, was not based on the Nanjing dialect.

In 1375, the Hongwu Emperor commissioned a dictionary known as the  intended to give a standard pronunciation. The dictionary was unsuccessful, criticised on one side for departing from the tradition of the Song dynasty rime dictionaries and rime tables, and on the other for not accurately reflecting the contemporary standard of elegant speech.

In addition to these "standard readings", he recorded a rather different body of "popular readings", some of which are also preserved in the works of Choe Sejin.
Kim Kwangjo, in his extensive study of these materials, concluded that Shin's standard readings constitute an idealized phonology of the earlier dictionary, while the popular readings reflect contemporary speech. In contrast, Yùchí Zhìpíng and Weldon South Coblin hold that the two readings reflect different versions of 15th-century standard speech.

The term , or "language of the officials", first appeared in Chinese sources in the mid-16th century.
Later in that century, the Jesuit missionary Matteo Ricci used the term in his diary:

The missionaries recognized the utility of this standard language, and embarked on its study. Ricci and Michele Ruggieri published a Portuguese-Mandarin dictionary in the 1580s. Nicolas Trigault's guide to Mandarin pronunciation was published in 1626. Grammars of Mandarin were produced by Francisco Varo (finished in 1672 but not printed until 1703) and Joseph Prémare (1730).

In 1728, the Yongzheng Emperor, unable to understand the accents of officials from Guangdong and Fujian, issued a decree requiring the governors of those provinces to provide for the teaching of proper pronunciation. Although the resulting Academies for Correct Pronunciation were short-lived, the decree did spawn a number of textbooks that give some insight into the ideal pronunciation.

Although Beijing had become the capital in 1420, its speech did not rival the prestige of the Nanjing-based standard until the middle of the Qing dynasty. As late as 1815, Robert Morrison based the first English–Chinese dictionary on the lower Yangtze koiné as the standard of the time, though he conceded that the Beijing dialect was gaining in influence. By the middle of the 19th century, the Beijing dialect had become dominant and was essential for any business with the imperial court. The new standard was described in grammars produced by Joseph Edkins (1864), Thomas Wade (1867) and Herbert Giles (1873).

In the early 20th century, reformers decided that China needed a national language. The traditional written form, Literary Chinese, was replaced with written vernacular Chinese, which drew its vocabulary and grammar from a range of Northern dialects (now known as Mandarin dialects). After unsuccessful attempts to define a cross-dialectal spoken standard, it was realized that a single spoken form must be selected. The only realistic candidate was the Beijing-based , which was adapted and developed into modern Standard Chinese, which is also often called Mandarin.

Phonology 
The initials of Shin Suk-ju's standard readings (mid-15th century) differed from those of Late Middle Chinese only in the merger of two series of retroflexes:

Sin's system had fewer finals than Late Middle Chinese.
In particular, final stops -p, -t and -k had all merged as a final glottal stop, as found in modern Jiang-Huai Mandarin:

The Middle Chinese level tone had split into two registers conditioned by voicing of the initial, as in modern Mandarin dialects.

The initials  and  had become voiced fricatives  and  respectively.  had merged into  before mid and low vowels, and both initials had disappeared before high vowels.
However unlike the contemporary Beijing pronunciation, early 19th century Mandarin still distinguished between palatalized velars and dental affricates, the source of the spellings "Peking" and "Tientsin" for modern "Beijing" and "Tianjin".

Vocabulary 
Most of the vocabulary found in descriptions of Mandarin speech before the mid-19th century has been retained by the modern standard language. However  several words that appear in the more broadly-based written vernacular of the Qing and earlier periods are absent from early accounts of standard speech.
These include such now-common words as   'to drink',   'very',   'all, whatsoever' and   'we (inclusive)'.
In other cases a northern form of a word displaced a southern form in the second half of 19th century, as in dōu  'all' (formerly ) and   'still, yet' (formerly ).

References 

Works cited

Further reading 
Modern studies
 
 
 
 

Early European dictionaries and grammars
 
 
 
 
 
 
 
  Volumes 1, 2 and 3.
 
 
  Volumes 1 and 2.

External links 
 Hóngwǔ Zhèngyùn (洪武正韻) at the Internet Archive.

Mandarin Chinese
Ming dynasty
Qing dynasty culture
History of the Chinese language
Languages attested from the 14th century